The 2021 season is Sandefjord's second season in the Eliteserien following their promotion from the 1. divisjon at the end of the 2019 season.

Season events

Squad

Out on loan

Transfers

Winter

Out:

Summer

In:

Out:

Friendlies

Competitions

Eliteserien

Results summary

Results by round

Results

Table

Norwegian Cup

Squad statistics

Appearances and goals

|-
|colspan="14"|Players away from Sandefjord on loan:

|-
|colspan="14"|Players who left Sandefjord during the season:

|}

Disciplinary record

References

Sandefjord Fotball seasons
Sandefjord